Yanjin County is located in the northeast of Yunnan Province, China, bordering Sichuan Province to the north and east. It is under the administration of the prefecture-level city of Zhaotong.

Situated on the banks of the narrow Heng River valley, a tributary of the Yangtze, Yanjing city has been referred to as the "World's Narrowest City." The buildings of the city are situated on tall pillars, which is a preemptive measure toward water-level rise during periods of heavy flooding. Videos of the city routinely go viral because of its uniqueness and the surrounding natural beauty, attracting much attention to the city.

History 
Since at least the Qin Dynasty (221–206 B.C.), the area of Yanjin city was home to the Bo people. 

During a Duanwu Festival celebration in the late 1800s or early 1900s at Yanjin city, a bridge that spanned the  Heng River collapsed and four hundred people were drowned. This led to the bridge being rebuilt with walls and a roof. The county was named after the city of Yanjin when it was formed in 1917. 

In 2021, management practices to institute an urban rain flood ecosystem were underway in Yanjin through use of the  sponge city approach to prepare for high flooding.

Climate

Administrative divisions
Yanjin County has 6 towns and 4 townships. 
6 towns

4 townships

Notes

References

External links
Yanjin County Official Website
further information

County-level divisions of Zhaotong